Lili Tampi (born 19 May 1970) is an Indonesian retired badminton player who specialized in doubles.

Career 
Tampi won mixed doubles at the 1996 Asian Championships with Tri Kusharjanto, however most of her titles came in women's doubles with her regular partner Finarsih. These included the Dutch Open (1993), the World Badminton Grand Prix (1993), the Indonesia (1993, 1994), the Chinese Taipei Open (1994), and the Badminton World Cup (1994). Tampi and Finarsih were silver medalists at the 1995 IBF World Championships in Lausanne, Switzerland. They were eliminated in the quarterfinals of the 1992 Olympic Games competition in Barcelona, Spain, and in the round of sixteen at the 1996 Olympics in Atlanta, Georgia, USA.

Tampi's most significant badminton accomplishment, however, came in Uber Cup (international women's team) competition. In both the 1994 and 1996 editions of this biennial event, she and Finarsih won their critical final round match, helping to lift Indonesia to unexpected victories over long dominant China.

Achievements

World Championships 
Women's doubles

World Cup 
Women's doubles

Asian Games 
Women's doubles

Asian Championships 
Mixed doubles

Asian Cup 
Women's doubles

Southeast Asian Games 
Women's doubles

IBF World Grand Prix (6 titles, 5 runners-up) 
The World Badminton Grand Prix was sanctioned by the International Badminton Federation from 1983 to 2006.

Women's doubles

 IBF Grand Prix tournament
 IBF Grand Prix Finals tournament

References

External links 
 

1970 births
Living people
People from Tasikmalaya
Sportspeople from West Java
Indonesian female badminton players
Badminton players at the 1992 Summer Olympics
Badminton players at the 1996 Summer Olympics
Olympic badminton players of Indonesia
Badminton players at the 1990 Asian Games
Badminton players at the 1994 Asian Games
Asian Games silver medalists for Indonesia
Asian Games bronze medalists for Indonesia
Asian Games medalists in badminton
Medalists at the 1990 Asian Games
Medalists at the 1994 Asian Games
Competitors at the 1991 Southeast Asian Games
Competitors at the 1993 Southeast Asian Games
Competitors at the 1995 Southeast Asian Games
Southeast Asian Games gold medalists for Indonesia
Southeast Asian Games silver medalists for Indonesia
Southeast Asian Games medalists in badminton
20th-century Indonesian women
21st-century Indonesian women